During the Italian Campaign of World War II, the Barbara Line was a series of German military fortifications in Italy, some  south of the Gustav Line, from Colli al Volturno to the Adriatic Coast in San Salvo and a similar distance north of the Volturno Line. Near the eastern coast, it ran along the line of the Trigno river. The line mostly consisted of fortified hilltop positions. The line was broken by the allied army in November 1943 following which the Axis forces withdrew to the defensible positions of the Winter Line.

Western breakthrough (U.S. Fifth Army front)
Generalfeldmarschall (Field marshal) Albert Kesselring—German commander-in-chief Italy—ordered his forces to retreat to the Barbara Line on 12 October 1943 after the U.S. Fifth Army crossed the Volturno River, breaching the Volturno defensive line.

By early November the Barbara Line on the Tyrrhenian Sea side of the Apennine Mountains had been breached by the U.S. Fifth Army, and the German Forces fell back to the Bernhardt Line.

Eastern breakthrough (British Eighth Army front)
The Allied Armies in Italy under General Sir Harold Alexander were fighting their way northward in Italy against determined German opposition skillfully directed by Albert Kesselring whose forces had prepared a succession of defensive lines. On the Adriatic front east of the Apennine Mountain spine was the British Eighth Army under General Bernard Montgomery. In October Eighth Army had crossed the Biferno river and the British Eighth Army had broken the Viktor/Volturno Line defences on 6 October. However, they had had to pause at the Trigno to re-group and reorganise their logistics along the poor roads stretching back to Bari and Taranto  and  respectively to the rear of the front. Delayed by these logistical problems, the Allies were not able to attack the next line of defences (the Barbara Line) behind the Trigno river immediately. It therefore was not until the early hours of 2 November that the V Corps on the right of the front on the coast and XIII Corps on their left attacked across the Trigno river.

Fighting was fierce, but on 3 November, British 78th Division reached San Salvo, some three miles beyond the Trigno, at which point Generalmajor Rudolf Sieckenius—commanding 16th Panzer Division—decided to make a fighting withdrawal to the Sangro river and the formidable Gustav defensive positions overlooking the river from the ridge tops on the far side. Forward elements of Eighth Army moved to make contact with the forward defenses of the German Winter Line on the high ground north of the Sangro River. The Allies were able to move forward without opposition and the Allied advance reached the Sangro on 9 November.

See also
 Allied invasion of Italy
 Italian Campaign
 British Eighth Army
 U.S. Fifth Army
 Volturno Line
 Bernhardt Line
 Battle of San Pietro Infine
 Gustav Line
 Gothic Line

Notes

References

German World War II defensive lines
World War II sites in Italy
Italian campaign (World War II)
World War II operations and battles of the Italian Campaign